The following is a list of peace processes of specific conflicts starting in the late twentieth century.

Starting in the twentieth century
Cyprus peace process, from c.1974 - a prolonged process to find a peaceful solution for the Cyprus problem
Western Sahara peace process, efforts since c.1991 to resolve the Western Sahara conflict
Israeli–Palestinian peace process, efforts since c.1991 to find a political accommodation for the Israeli–Palestinian conflict and the wider Arab–Israeli conflict
Negotiations to end apartheid in South Africa, successful talks that brought about the end of the apartheid system
Nagorno-Karabakh peace process coordinated by the OSCE Minsk Group (1991–present), attempts to resolve the Nagorno-Karabakh conflict
Kurdish–Turkish peace process, failed attempts to resolve the Kurdish–Turkish conflict (1978–present)
1991–2004 Kurdish–Turkish peace initiatives
1993 Kurdistan Workers' Party ceasefire
2009–2010 Kurdistan Workers' Party ceasefire
2013–2015 PKK–Turkey peace process
Northern Ireland peace process, efforts from c.1993 to end "the Troubles"
Guatemalan Peace Process 1994-1996, successful process that ended the Guatemalan Civil War
Colombia
1999–2002 FARC–Government peace process, failed attempt to resolve the Colombian conflict
Colombian peace process (2012–2016), ongoing process to bring an end to the Colombian conflict

Twenty-first century
Syrian peace process (2011–present), various attempts to find a political solution for the Syrian Civil War
Yemeni peace process (2011–present), attempts to resolve the Yemeni Crisis, resulted in replacement of the President, but no end to the violence
Bangsamoro peace process, attempts to find solution for the Moro conflict
Libyan peace process (2015–2020), resolution of the Second Libyan Civil War, leading to the Government of National Unity in February 2021 and planned presidential and parliamentary elections in June 2022
Afghan peace process (2018-2021), various attempts to find a peaceful resolve to the War in Afghanistan, ended with a decisive Taliban military victory
2018–19 Korean peace process, failed attempt to end the Korean conflict
Sudanese peace process (2019–present), attempts to resolve the War in Darfur and the Sudanese conflict in South Kordofan and Blue Nile
Tigrayan peace process (2020–present), attempts to resolve the Tigray War
2022 Russia–Ukraine peace negotiations, peace negotiations between Russia and Ukraine after the former's invasion of the latter

See also
List of peace activists

Diplomacy-related lists
Geography-related lists